The ABC Sinfonia was an Australian training orchestra established as the National Training Orchestra by the Australian Broadcasting Commission (ABC) in 1967. In 1980, the Orchestra was renamed ABC Sinfonia. Based in Sydney, the 40-piece orchestra was entered by scholarship, and was intended to train music postgraduates to join the state symphony orchestras. 
At 30 June 1984, the Sinfonia had 42 full-time scholarship holders, eight of whom were on bursaries from the Sydney Symphony Orchestra, and by 1986, 230 players had been members of the orchestra.

The Sinfonia was disbanded in 1986, after a structural and budgetary review of the ABC resulted in the divestment of its orchestra holdings.

See also 
 List of youth orchestras

References 

1967 establishments in Australia
1986 disestablishments in Australia
Australian orchestras
Disbanded orchestras
Australian youth orchestras
Musical groups established in 1967
Musical groups disestablished in 1986
Australian Broadcasting Corporation